A classification yard (American and Canadian English (Canadian National Railway use)), marshalling yard (British, Hong Kong, Indian, Australian, and Canadian English (Canadian Pacific Railway use)) or shunting yard (Central Europe) is a railway yard found at some freight train stations, used to separate railway cars onto one of several tracks.  First the cars are taken to a track, sometimes called a lead or a drill.  From there the cars are sent through a series of switches called a ladder onto the classification tracks.  Larger yards tend to put the lead on an artificially built hill called a hump to use the force of gravity to propel the cars through the ladder.

Freight trains that consist of isolated cars must be made into trains and divided according to their destinations. Thus the cars must be shunted several times along their route in contrast to a unit train, which carries, for example, cars from the plant to a port, or coal from a mine to the power plant. This shunting is done partly at the starting and final destinations and partly (for long-distance-hauling) in classification yards.

Types

Flat yard 
Flat yards are constructed on flat ground, or on a gentle slope, not enough to allow a free-fall operation without locomotives. Freight cars are pushed by a locomotive and coast to their required location.

Gravity yard 
Gravity yards were invented in the 19th century, saving shunting engines and instead letting the cars roll by gravity was seen as a major benefit, whereas the larger amount of manual work required to stop the rolling cars in the classification tracks was judged to be not that important. Gravity yards were a historical step in the development of classification yards and were later judged as inferior to hump yards, because it became clear that shunting engines were needed anyway (at least in inclement weather like strong winds or icy temperatures when the oil in the bearings became thick), and because manual labour was getting relatively more and more expensive. Thus, only few gravity yards were ever built, sometimes requiring massive earthwork (one example is the first German gravity yard at Dresden). The historic technique of a gravity yard is today partly presented in Chemnitz-Hilbersdorf gravity yard (museum). 

Most gravity yards were built in Germany (especially in the kingdom of Saxony) and in Great Britain (so Egdehill, 1873), a few also in some other European countries, for example Łazy yard near Zawiercie on the Warsaw-Vienna Railway (in Poland). In the USA, there were only very few old gravity yards; one of the few gravity yards in operation today is CSX's Readville Yard south of Boston, Massachusetts.

Hump yard 

Hump yards are the largest and most effective classification yards, with the largest shunting capacity, often several thousand cars a day. They work similarly to gravity yards, but the falling gradient is limited to a small part of the yard, namely the hump. It is the heart of the yard—a lead track on a small hill over which an engine pushes the cars.  Single cars, or a block of coupled cars, are uncoupled at or just before the crest of the hump, and roll by gravity onto their destination tracks in the area of the yard where the cars are sorted, called the classification bowl. The first hump in Germany (Leipzig) was built in 1858 and in France (Saint-Etienne) in 1863. 

The speed of the cars rolling down from the hump into the classification bowl must be regulated according to whether they are full or empty, heavy or light freight, varying number of axles, whether there are few or many cars on the classification tracks, and varying weather conditions, including temperature, wind speed and direction. In regards to speed regulation, there are two types of hump yards—with or without mechanisation by retarders. In the old non-retarder yards braking was usually done in Europe by railroaders who laid skates onto the tracks. The skate or wheel chock was manually (or, in rare cases, mechanically) placed on one or both of the rails so that the treadles or rims of the wheel or wheels caused frictional retardation and resulted in the halting of the railway car. In the United States this braking was done by riders on the cars. In the modern retarder yards this work is done by mechanized "rail brakes" called retarders, which brake the cars by gripping the wheels. They are operated either pneumatically or hydraulically.  Pneumatic systems are prevalent in the United States, France, Belgium, Russia and China, while hydraulic systems are used in Germany, Italy and the Netherlands.

Classification bowls in Europe typically consist of 20 to 40 tracks, divided into several fans or balloons of tracks, usually with eight classification tracks following a retarder in each one, often 32 tracks altogether. In the United States, many classification bowls have more than 40 tracks, which are often divided into six to ten classification tracks in each balloon loop.

Bailey Yard in North Platte, Nebraska, United States, the world's largest classification yard, is a hump yard. Other large American hump yards include Argentine Yard in Kansas City, Kansas, Robert Young Yard in Elkhart, Indiana, Clearing Yard in Chicago, Illinois, Englewood Yard in Houston, Texas, and Waycross Rice Yard in Waycross, Georgia. Notably, in Europe, Russia and China, all major classification yards are hump yards. Europe's largest hump yard is that of Maschen near Hamburg, Germany; it is only slightly smaller than Bailey Yard. The second largest is in the port of Antwerp, Belgium. Most hump yards are single yards with one classification bowl, but some, mostly very large, hump yards have two of them, one for each direction, thus are double yards, such as the Maschen, Antwerp, Clearing, and Bailey yards. According to the PRRT&HS PRR Chronology, the first hump yard in the United States was opened May 11, 1903, as part of the Altoona Yards at Bells Mills (East Altoona).  Other sources report the PRR yard at Youngwood, Pennsylvania, which opened in the 1880s to serve the Connellsville coke fields, as the first U.S. hump yard.

Almost all gravity yards have been retrofitted with humps and are worked as hump yards. Examples include Dresden Friedrichstadt and Nürnberg (Nuremberg) Rbf (Rbf: Rangierbahnhof, "classification yard"), both in Germany.

Image gallery

See also
 Goods station
 List of rail yards
 Rail yard
 Siding (rail)
 Shunting (rail)

References

International Railway Journal (IRJ), New York. Special editions about hump yards in various countries: issues II/66, II/70, VI/75, II/80.
 
 Rhodes, Michael: The Illustrated History of British Marshalling Yards. Sparkford: Haynes Oxford Publishing & Co, 1988. . Out of print.
 Kraft, Edwin: The Yard: Railroading's Hidden Half. In: Trains (vol. 62) 2002. Part I: VI/02, pp. 46–67; part II: VII/02, pp. 36–47. .
 Wegner, Robert: Classification yards. Map of the Month. In: Trains IV/2003, pp. 42–43.
 Rhodes, Michael: North American Railyards. St. Paul (USA): Motorbooks International (MBI Publishing Company) 2003. .

External links

 Refuge Sidings, Exchange Sidings and Marshalling Yards
 Villon – transportation terminal simulation tool
 Time-lapse video of German hump-shunting yard operation

Articles containing video clips
Rail yards
Railway sidings
Railway stations by type